Coney Island is a water park located on the banks of the Ohio River in Cincinnati, Ohio, approximately  east of the downtown area in Anderson Township. One of its notable features is its Sunlite Pool attraction, which is the largest recirculating pool in North America.

The park sits adjacent to Riverbend Music Center and Belterra Park. Beginning in 1870, the original owner called the area Parker's Grove, which was later renamed Ohio Grove, The Coney Island of the West after the Ohio Grove Corporation purchased the park in 1886. The name was shortened to Coney Island the following season. Over the years, the park expanded with dozens of rides and attractions, leading to its popularity as an amusement park destination. 

Coney Island was sold to Taft Broadcasting in 1969 with intentions to move the park to a new, larger destination away from frequent flooding. The new park opened as Kings Island in 1972, although Coney Island's Sunlite Pool remained in operation. Smaller flat rides eventually returned, and additional investments and improvements were made to the Sunlite Pool area. These changes, along with the opening of the nearby Riverbend Music Center in 1984, allowed the park's attendance and profitability to recover. In 2019, Coney Island removed amusement rides in an effort to focus its operations exclusively on water park amenities.

History 
Parker soon realized the popularity of the farm's location, and that renting it out was more profitable than his apple orchard. He named it Parker's Grove and eventually added a dining hall, dancing hall, and bowling alley. He later sold the land in 1886 for $17,500 to a company called Ohio Grove Corporation headed by two steamboat captains. For the opening on June 21, 1886, the name was officially changed to "Ohio Grove, The Coney Island of the West" in an effort to link the park with the famous New York destination. With its riverfront location, the riverboat became the most popular method of transportation for park visitors. In 1887, "Ohio Grove" was completely dropped from the name as the park became known simply as "Coney Island".

The Sunlite Pool was added in 1925. It is an outdoor freshwater pool with  surface area, ranking as 12th-largest pool in the world . It remains the largest recirculating pool in North America. 

Over the years, Coney Island became a full-fledged amusement park, complete with rides and carnival games. Notable additions included the first and second Island Queen in 1896 and 1925, respectively, Moonlite Gardens dance pavilion in 1925, the Wildcat and Twister wooden roller coasters in 1926, the Land of Oz children's section in 1934, and the Shooting Star roller coaster (a renovation of the former Clipper roller coaster) in 1947.

Coney Island became a Cincinnati institution. It was desegregated after being sued in 1952 by Marian Spencer. The park's proximity to the river made it prone to frequent flooding. In 1968, park management entered into talks with Taft Broadcasting for the purpose of developing a new park on higher ground. Coney Island closed its amusements on September 6, 1971, as most of its rides were moved to the newly completed Kings Island theme park.

After Kings Island opened in 1972, Taft Broadcasting intended to sell Coney Island's land for redevelopment. However, with the company's decision to open another theme park in Virginia (Kings Dominion) and its acquisition of Carowinds on the North Carolina-South Carolina border, the property's redevelopment became a low priority. Less than two years after closing, Coney Island reopened permanently in 1973. The park was only a shadow of its former self but still featured several popular attractions. The Sunlite Pool was one of those attractions that helped Coney Island remain a popular summertime destination.

The park donated  of land for the construction of Riverbend Music Center which opened in 1984. The land was the former location of the Wildcat and Shooting Star roller coasters. The Riverbend amphitheater serves as the summer home of the Cincinnati Symphony and Pops Orchestras, as well as a concert venue for other musical acts. In 1991, Coney Island was purchased by Cincinnati businessman Ronald Walker. No longer held back by a corporate entity, management has been able to restore Coney Island as a traditional amusement park with familiar rides such as the "Tilt-A-Whirl", bumper cars, carnival games and musical shows.

Coney Island announced plans to remove all amusement rides from the park on September 21, 2019, but continues to operate as a water park featuring the Sunlite Pool and other water-related attractions. The decision was based on attendance, consumer feedback, and rising costs associated with maintaining ride operation.

Current attractions

Sunlite Water Adventure

Family attractions

Former attractions

Pre-1972

Post-1972

Events 
Coney Island serves as the location for several festivals, including Summerfair Arts Festival, the "Cincinnati Celtic World Festival", the Appalachian Festival, and the Cincinnati Flower and Farm Fest. Concerts are also held in the Moonlite Gardens area of the park, most notably by Over the Rhine.

Scenes from the old children's TV show The Banana Splits were filmed on location at Coney Island.

References

External links

ConeyislandCentral.com  

Amusement parks in Ohio
Tourist attractions in Cincinnati
Buildings and structures in Cincinnati
Defunct amusement parks in Ohio
1886 establishments in Ohio
1974 establishments in Ohio